The Eiao monarch (Pomarea fluxa) is an extinct species of bird in the family Monarchidae. The species is sometimes considered to have been conspecific with the Iphis monarch. It was endemic to French Polynesia. Its natural habitats were subtropical or tropical dry forests, subtropical or tropical moist lowland forests, and subtropical or tropical moist shrubland.

The Eiao Monarch was last seen in 1977. The likely cause of extinction is thought to have been introduced predators (feral cats, black rats) however, other contributing factors may have included possible avian disease from introduced species (Chestnut-breasted Mannikin) and habitat loss caused by intensive grazing by introduced sheep.

Taxonomy and systematics
Until 2012, the Eiao monarch was considered to be a subspecies (Pomarea iphis fluxa) of the Iphis monarch.

References

Pomarea
Extinct birds of Oceania
Birds described in 1928
Taxa named by Robert Cushman Murphy
Species made extinct by human activities
Taxonomy articles created by Polbot
†
†